The Crom Estate (pronounced K-ROM') is a nature reserve located in the south of County Fermanagh, Northern Ireland, along the shores of Upper Lough Erne. It is one of three estates owned and managed by the National Trust in County Fermanagh, the others being Florence Court and Castle Coole mansions. The estate comprises , composed primarily of riparian forest. Some trees are so ancient that physical access is restricted.

Features

The estate is open to the public for recreational activities and weddings. The ruins of the old castle, a bowling green and garden are tourist attractions.

History
Like many Ulster country estates, the first house at Crom was built by a Scottish Planter at the beginning of the 17th century. In 1611, as part of the Plantation of Ulster, Michael Balfour, the Laird of Mountwhinney, constructed a house on the lough shore opposite Inishfendra Island. Following the usual pattern for a Plantation castle, it was built of lime and stone and enclosed within a bawn. The castle was invaded twice by believers of the Jacobitism before it was burnt down in the early 1760s. The ruins of this castle still survive today. In 1840 a new neo-Tudor Crom Castle was built, designed by Scottish architect Edward Blore. It remains the property of the Earl of Erne and is not open to the public. The estate was given to the National Trust by The 6th Earl of Erne (often known as Harry Erne) in 1987.

Crom Estate was the location of a great Classic yacht and steamboat regatta in August 2010 when the races of the 1890s were recreated in Trial bay using Norfork Broads One-Designs (brown boats), Lough Erne Fairies, Fife One Designs from Anglesea, and a pair of Colleens.  Racing took place on Upper Lough Erne within sight of the castle, and the boats moored each evening off the boathouse in Crom Bay.

References

External links 
 Virtual Tour of Crom Estate Northern Ireland - Virtual Visit Northern Ireland
 DOENI Upper Lough Erne biodiversity profile.

Conservation in Northern Ireland
Buildings and structures in County Fermanagh
Forests and woodlands of Northern Ireland
National Trust properties in Northern Ireland
Northern Ireland coast and countryside
Nature reserves in Northern Ireland
Protected areas of County Fermanagh